Negar, Negâr is a feminine given name of Persian origin meaning "sweetheart, soulmate , idol or beloved .", it also means "pattern and painting".

Words from the same family:
 Negarandeh:  Painter, sculptor 
 Negaresh: editing, formatting
 Negaridan: gerund form of painting, editing
 Negarin: beautified piece
 Negargar: Sculptor, painter

Notable people

Given name
 Negar Nikki Amini, Iranian-born Swedish marketer at Universal Music Groups.
 Negar Assari, painter, photographer, sculptor, and graphic artist.
 Negar Bouban, Iranian musician.
 Négar Djavadi, Iranian-French novelist, screenwriter and filmmaker.
 Negar Esmaeili, Iranian taekwondo practitioner.
 Negar Foroozandeh, Iranian actress.
 Negar Javaherian, Iranian film and theater actress and translator.
 Negar Khan, Iranian-born Norwegian actress.
 Negar Mortazavi, Iranian-American journalist.
 Negar Mottahedeh, cultural critic and film theorist.

Surname
 Shiva Negar, Iranian-Canadian actress and model.

Notes

Persian feminine given names

no:Nigar